Category 2 is the fourth-highest classification on the Saffir–Simpson hurricane wind scale, and categorizes tropical cyclones with 1-minute maximum sustained winds between . Tropical cyclones that strengthen to Category 2 status and make landfall are capable of causing severe damage to human lives and infrastructure. As of 2022, a total of 89 hurricanes have peaked at Category 2 intensity within the Northeast Pacific tropical cyclone basin, which is defined as the region of the Pacific Ocean north of the equator and east of the International Date Line. Collectively, 1,775 people have been killed as a result of Category 2 Pacific hurricanes. Storms that also attained Category 3, 4, or 5 status on the scale are not included.

There is a plethora of factors that influence tropical cyclogenesis, the formation of tropical cyclones, in the Northeastern Pacific. The North Pacific High and Aleutian Low, which occur from December to April, produce strong upper-level winds which prevents the formation of tropical cyclones. During the summer and early autumn months, sea surface temperatures are generally warm enough to support tropical cyclone development in the Northeast Pacific, and perhaps even rapid intensification. Additionally, El Niño events cause more powerful hurricanes to form by generating weaker wind shear and higher sea surface temperatures, while La Niña events reduce the number of such hurricanes by doing the opposite.

Background

Category 2 hurricanes that make landfall have the potential to cause extensive damage. There is also a substantial risk of injury or death to humans and animals due to flying debris.

The Northeast Pacific tropical cyclone basin is the area of the Pacific Ocean north of the equator and east of the International Date Line. The basin is further divided into the east and central Pacific sub-basins. The east Pacific is located between the western coast of North America and the 140th meridian west. The east Pacific is monitored by the National Hurricane Center, the current Regional Specialized Meteorological Center (RSMC) for that area. The central Pacific is located between the 140th meridian west and the International Date Line. It currently has the Central Pacific Hurricane Center as its RSMC. Tropical cyclones occur less frequently in the central Pacific than in the east Pacific, with some years featuring no systems forming or crossing into the basin. Since 1949, all tropical cyclones that have been recorded by RSMCs, both past and present, are listed in the Northeast and North Central Pacific hurricane database (HURDAT), which is produced and supported by the National Hurricane Center.

The only deviations from these procedures occurred when humans were able to take pressure and/or wind measurements. Due lack of specific wind and pressure records, there have been only two confirmed Category 2 hurricanes prior to 1970.

Climatology

In the east Pacific and central Pacific sub-basins, hurricane season begins on May 15 and June 1, respectively, with both concluding on November 30. Since 1949, a total of 84 Category 2 hurricanes have developed in the Northeast Pacific basin. Only one has occurred in the off-season: Hurricane Pali of 2016, which developed on January 7, and marks the earliest formation of a tropical cyclone in the Northeastern Pacific basin on record. In addition to Pali, 3 systems formed in May, 8 in June, 17 in July, 22 in August, 17 in September, 12 in October, and 4 in November.

The majority of tropical cyclones form and organize in areas of warm sea surface temperatures, usually of at least  and low vertical wind shear; however, there are outliers to this general rule, such as storms that manage to intensify despite high amounts of vertical wind shear. When a pre-existing tropical disturbance – usually a tropical wave or a disturbance originating in the Intertropical Convergence Zone – enters an area where the aforementioned conditions are present, the disturbance can develop into a tropical cyclone, provided it is far enough from the equator to experience a sufficiently strong Coriolis force, which causes the counterclockwise rotation of hurricanes in the Northern Hemisphere. Between the months of December and April, sea surface temperatures in the tropics, where most Northeast Pacific tropical cyclones develop, are usually too low to support significant development. Also, the presence of a semi-permanent high-pressure area known as the North Pacific High in the eastern Pacific greatly reduces tropical cyclone development in the winter months, as the North Pacific High results in vertical wind shear that causes environmental conditions to be unconducive to tropical cyclone formation. Another factor preventing tropical cyclones from forming during the winter is the presence of a semi-permanent low-pressure area called the Aleutian Low between January and April. Its effects in the central Pacific near the 160th meridian west cause tropical waves that form in the area to move northward into the Gulf of Alaska. As the disturbances travel northward, they dissipate or transition into an extratropical cyclone. The Aleutian Low's retreat in late-April allows the warmth of the Pacific High to meander in, bringing its powerful clockwise wind circulation with it. During the month of May, the Intertropical Convergence Zone migrates southward while vertical shear over the tropics decreases. As a result, the earliest tropical waves begin to form, coinciding with the start of the eastern Pacific hurricane season on May 15. During summer and early autumn, sea surface temperatures rise further, reaching  in July and August, well above the  threshold for the formation and intensification of tropical cyclones. This allows for tropical cyclones developing during that time to strengthen significantly, perhaps even rapidly.

The El Niño-Southern Oscillation also influences the frequency and intensity of hurricanes in the Northeast Pacific basin. During El Niño events, sea surface temperatures increase in the Northeast Pacific and vertical wind shear decreases. Because of this, an increase in tropical cyclone activity occurs; the opposite happens in the Atlantic basin during El Niño, where increased wind shear creates an unfavorable environment for tropical cyclone formation. Contrary to El Niño, La Niña events increase wind shear and decreases sea surface temperatures over the eastern Pacific, while reducing wind shear and increasing sea surface temperatures over the Atlantic.

Within the Northeast Pacific, the easterly trade winds cause tropical cyclones to generally move westward out into the open Pacific Ocean. Only rarely do tropical cyclones forming during the peak months of the season make landfall. Closer to the end of the season, the subtropical ridge steers some storms northwards or northeastwards. Storms influenced by this ridge may bring impacts to the western coasts of Mexico and occasionally even Central America. In the central Pacific basin, the North Pacific High keeps tropical cyclones away from the Hawaiian Islands by forcing them southwards. Combined with cooler waters around the Hawaiian Islands that tend to weaken tropical cyclones that approach them, this makes direct impacts on the Hawaiian Islands by tropical cyclones rare.

Systems
Key
 Discontinuous duration (weakened below Category 2 then restrengthened to that classification at least once)
 Intensified past Category 2 intensity after exiting basin

Landfalls

Out of the 83 Category 2 hurricanes in the east and central Pacific, 23 have made landfall as a tropical cyclone, collectively resulting in 27 landfalls. As tropical cyclones tend to weaken before landfall due to the effects of land interaction, only seven Category 2 hurricanes actually made landfall while still at Category 2 strength. Five storms made landfall twice each, namely Irah (1973), Paul (1982), Adolph (1983), Calvin (1993), and Marty (2003); Paul made both landfalls at Category 2 strength. No Category 2 Pacific hurricane to date has made landfall more than twice. Multiple Category 2 hurricanes made landfall only in 2 years: 1971, with two systems (Agatha and Bridget) making landfall, and 2003, with three systems (Ignacio, Marty, and Nora) making landfall.

See also

 List of Eastern Pacific tropical storms
 List of Category 1 Pacific hurricanes
 List of Category 3 Pacific hurricanes
 List of Category 4 Pacific hurricanes
 List of Category 5 Pacific hurricanes
 List of Pacific hurricanes
 Pacific hurricane season

Notes

References

Category 2
Pacific 2